Dakahla or Daqahlah (دقهلة, Coptic: Ⲧⲕⲉϩⲗⲓ) is one of the old villages of Damietta. Champollion has stated that the village is located on the Phatnitic branch of the Nile delta and it was about 24 kilometers (15 miles) away from Tell el-Farma.

History 
The village of Dakahla at the time of the Islamic conquest was called Tkehli (تكيهلي), and It was located in a strategic position which allowed for great administration of the area, and It became the capital of a Koor (Nome) of the Caliphate at the time.

The village began declining at the end of the Fatimid period, and the capital of the area changed from Dakahla to Chemoun Erman (أشمون الرمان)

During Ottoman times, It was part of the walayah of Dakahlia, and at 1813 it was under the Mudiriyah of Dakahlia.

Currently it is part of the Governorate of Damietta.

References 

Populated places in Damietta Governorate